Andreas Heinz may refer to:

 Andreas Heinz (psychotherapist) (born 1960), German psychiatrist and psychotherapist
 Andreas Heinz (badminton) (born 1991), German badminton player